Ab Bid (also Romanized as Āb Bīd) is a village in Kushk Rural District, Abezhdan District, Andika County, Khuzestan Province, Iran. At the 2006 census, its population was 417, in 67 families.

References 

Populated places in Andika County